The 2020 Delaware State Hornets football team represented Delaware State University in the 2020–21 NCAA Division I FCS football season. They were led by third-year head coach Rod Milstead and played their home games at Alumni Stadium. They were a member of the Mid-Eastern Athletic Conference (MEAC).

On July 16, 2020, the MEAC announced that it would cancel its fall sports seasons due to the COVID-19 pandemic. The league did not rule out the possibility of playing in the spring, and later released its spring schedule on December 14, 2020.

Previous season

The Hornets finished the 2019 season 2–10, 1–7 in MEAC play to finish in last place.

Schedule

References

Delaware State
Delaware State Hornets football seasons
Delaware State Hornets football